We Moderns is a 1925 American silent comedy film directed by John Francis Dillon and starring Colleen Moore. The film was produced by Moore's husband John McCormick and was released through First National Pictures. It was based on the play and novel by Israel Zangwill. The play ran for 22 performances in 1924 at the Gaiety Theatre in New York, produced and directed by Harrison Grey Fiske and starring Helen Hayes and Isabel Irving.

Plot
As described in a film magazine review, Mary Sundale is a young woman who spurns her childhood sweetheart to attach herself to a large group of riotous, semi-artistic young people and becomes infatuated with a superficial poet and critic. One night this poet becomes too bold in his advances and is thrashed by the man who has been rejected. On a later night, the group holds a party in a dirigible. The ship crashes and fear grips the revelers. Mary, now disgusted with the group and all it represents, mends her manner of living and plans a future with the man who has always sincerely loved her.

Cast

Production
Portions of the film were shot on location in and around London while Colleen was in the city during her European tour, which was undertaken to promote her films So Big and Sally. Those portions were directed by her husband and depicted a scavenger hunt, so that the production could visit many famous and recognizable London locations . A car was purchased specifically for the film and was shipped back to the states so that the film could be completed at the studio. Colleen had to acquire a special permit to drive. The film was intended to be an English look at the flapper, and the story shared many of the same elements of Colleen's star-making Flaming Youth. As in Flaming Youth, Colleen's brother Cleeve had a part in this film as well. He played the brother of Colleen's character.

Preservation
With no record of any prints of We Moderns located in any film archives, it is a lost film.

See also
List of lost films

References

Bibliography
Jeff Codori, Colleen Moore; A Biography of the Silent Film Star, McFarland Publishing (2012)  (print)  (eBook)

External links

 
 

1925 films
Silent American comedy films
American silent feature films
American films based on plays
Films directed by John Francis Dillon
Lost American films
Lost comedy films
Films set in London
Films shot in London
First National Pictures films
American black-and-white films
1925 comedy films
1925 lost films
1920s American films